In probability theory and statistics, the hyperbolic secant distribution is a continuous probability distribution whose probability density function and characteristic function are proportional to the hyperbolic secant function. The hyperbolic secant function is equivalent to the reciprocal hyperbolic cosine, and thus this distribution is also called the inverse-cosh distribution.

Generalisation of the distribution gives rise to the Meixner distribution, also known as the Natural Exponential Family - Generalised Hyperbolic Secant or NEF-GHS distribution.

Explanation 
A random variable follows a hyperbolic secant distribution if its probability density function (pdf) can be related to the following standard form of density function by a location and shift transformation:

where "sech" denotes the hyperbolic secant function.
The cumulative distribution function (cdf) of the standard distribution is a scaled and shifted version of the Gudermannian function,

where "arctan" is the inverse (circular) tangent function.
The inverse cdf (or quantile function) is

where "arsinh" is the inverse hyperbolic sine function and "cot" is the (circular) cotangent function.

The hyperbolic secant distribution shares many properties with the standard normal distribution: it is symmetric with unit variance and zero mean, median and mode, and its pdf is proportional to its characteristic function. However, the hyperbolic secant distribution is leptokurtic; that is, it has a more acute peak near its mean, and heavier tails, compared with the standard normal distribution.

Johnson et al. (1995) places this distribution in the context of a class of generalized forms of the logistic distribution, but use a different parameterisation of the standard distribution compared to that here. Ding (2014) shows three occurrences of the Hyperbolic secant distribution in statistical modeling and inference.

Generalisations

Convolution 
Considering the (scaled) sum of  independent and identically distributed hyperbolic secant random variables:

then in the limit  the distribution of  will tend to the normal distribution , in accordance with the central limit theorem.

This allows a convenient family of distributions to be defined with properties intermediate between the hyperbolic secant and the normal distribution, controlled by the shape parameter , which can be extended to non-integer values via the characteristic function

Moments can be readily calculated from the characteristic function.  The excess kurtosis is found to be .

Skew 

A skewed form of the distribution can be obtained by multiplying by the exponential  and normalising, to give the distribution

where the parameter value  corresponds to the original distribution.

Location and scale 

The distribution (and its generalisations) can also trivially be shifted and scaled in the usual way to give a corresponding location-scale family

All of the above 

Allowing all four of the adjustments above gives distribution with four parameters, controlling shape, skew, location, and scale respectively, called either the Meixner distribution after Josef Meixner who first investigated the family, or the NEF-GHS distribution (Natural exponential family - Generalised Hyperbolic Secant distribution).

Losev (1989) has studied independently the asymmetric (skewed) curve  which uses just two parameters . They have to be both positive or negative, with  being the secant, and  being its further reshaped form.

In financial mathematics the Meixner distribution has been used to model non-Gaussian movement of stock-prices, with applications including the pricing of options.

References

 
 
 
 
 Matthias J. Fischer (2013), Generalized Hyperbolic Secant Distributions: With Applications to Finance, Springer. . Google Books

Continuous distributions